Lindsey House is a Grade I listed building in Lincoln's Inn Fields, London. Attributed to architect Inigo Jones.

It was built in 1638–41, with alterations by Isaac Ware in 1751–52 to form two houses. Lindsey House has been a listed building since 1951.

References

Houses completed in 1641
Grade I listed houses in London
Houses in the London Borough of Camden
1641 establishments in England
Grade I listed buildings in the London Borough of Camden